Matthew Barker (1619 – 25 March 1698) was an English Independent minister and parliamentarian, known for his work on natural theology and for his participation in English 17th-century politics.

Life

Matthew Barker was born in Great Cransley, Northamptonshire, to parents unknown.  He worked as a schoolmaster in Banbury, Oxfordshire, until the outbreak of the English Civil War, at which point he became preacher to a London parish.  Barker was an avid parliamentarian and was invited to preach a sermon before the House of Commons on 25 October 1648.  The new republic welcomed him, and his moderation earned him the favour of the Cromwell regime, which made him an assistant to the London commission.

After the Restoration of the English monarchy, Barker became a nonconformist, forming his own London congregation.  Following the Glorious Revolution, Barker worked to promote unity among Dissenters.  To this end he published a collection of advice for scholars entering the ministry, entitled Flores intellectuales.  Barker's major published work was Natural Theology in which Barker sought to demonstrate the existence of God from the properties of nature. He died in London.

References

E. C. Vernon, ‘Barker, Matthew (1619–1698)’, Oxford Dictionary of National Biography, Oxford University Press, 2004, accessed 23 Jan 2009

External links

1619 births
1698 deaths
Alumni of Trinity College, Cambridge
English naturalists
Paleobotanists
People from Wellingborough
English Congregationalists
English independent ministers of the Interregnum (England)
Ejected English ministers of 1662